An octafluoride is a compound or ion with the formula  or , where n, m and q are independent variables and R any substituent and M is a central element (often a metal).

Neutral octafluorides
No electrically neutral octafluorides are currently known to exist, although osmium octafluoride, is theoretically possible.

Anionic octafluorides
In contrast, many anionic octafluorides are known, such as the octafluorozirconate(IV), octafluorotantalate(V), octafluoroniobate(V), octafluoromolybdate(VI), octafluorotungstate(VI), octafluororhenate(VII), octafluoroiodate(VII), octafluoroiridate(VII), and octafluoroxenate(VI) anions.

References

Fluorides